was a Japanese playwright, director, translator, and actor. He is famous for his critically acclaimed play, A Woman's Life (Onna no isshō), one of Japan's most frequently staged plays post World War II. Morimoto's work was most popular during the post-war period but his plays are still read and performed today. He was born in Osaka, Japan, in 1912 and later moved to Kyoto, where he received a degree in English literature from Kyoto University in 1937. Morimoto died in 1946 after a long battle with tuberculosis.

Personal life

School and early life 
Morimoto began writing plays before World War II. During this time, he was a disciple of Kunio Kishida, one of the most prominent Japanese playwrights of the 20th century, as well as the main founder of Bungakuza. Morimoto was in high school when he first contracted tuberculosis. He managed to mostly recover but the disease would continue to adversely affect his health in the future, eventually taking his life in 1946. Morimoto studied English Literature and graduated from Kyoto University in 1937.

Marriage and affair 
Despite being married, Kaoru Morimoto was suspected of having an affair with his colleague, the actor Haruko Sugimura. Their relationship most likely lasted until Morimoto's death in 1946.

Death 
During World War II, Morimoto relapsed from the pulmonary tuberculosis he first contracted while in high school. He died on June 4, 1946, at the age of thirty-four.

Career

A Woman's Life 

Kaoru Morimoto is known today for his famous play A Woman's Life, about a young girl named Kei who grows up in Japan during the early twentieth century and takes over a successful family trading business that conducts trade with China. The play was commissioned by Japanese military authorities as a piece of nationalist propaganda A Woman's Life was hugely popular in Japan after the war, and was even translated into Chinese and Russian to be performed overseas. After the war and right before his death in 1946, Morimoto rewrote the first and last scenes of the play to ensure the story would remain relevant in the new political landscape of Japan post-war.

Involvement in Bungakuza 
In December 1940, Morimoto joined the Bungakuza, also known as the, "Literature Theatre Company," a Japanese theatre group that worked to publish and perform literature in a time when most theatre groups had been banned as the result of extreme government censorship. Morimoto joined just a few months after the Japanese government began harshly cracking down on Theatre. He was brought to the group by Iwata Toyoo (whose stage name was Bunroku Shishi), one of the company's founders. Soon after joining, Morimoto was recognized as one of Bungakuza's most talented members and he quickly assumed positions in leadership. He prided himself on his ability to produce literature regardless of the current political atmosphere. A Woman's Life was a major source of revenue for the company after the war, saving the group from financial hardship on more than one occasion. The group had performed the play over 250 times by the mid 1950s. Many account Bungakuza's success during a time of strict censorship to Morimoto and [[A woman's life|A Woman's Life]].

Other works 
At the Damn, a one-act play by Morimoto, was written in 1934 while he was still in high school. It is cited as being Morimoto's first original literary work. Morimoto also wrote many plays while under the tutelage of Kunio Kishida. A Splendid Woman (Migoto na onna), another of Morimoto's earliest plays, was published in a magazine edited by Kishida titled, Gekisaku (Playwright). The play was published in 1934 while Morimoto was still attending Kyoto University.

Doto (The Angry Waves), based on the story of Japanese scientist Kitasato Shibasaburō, was performed by the New National Theatre in Tokyo as a part of their 1999–2000 season.

Major works 
At the Damn: One-act (1934)
Family-Style: One-act (1934)
Home: One-act (1934)
Beautiful Woman: One-act (1934)
Hanabanashiki Clan: Three acts (1935)
Costume: One-act (1936)
Mrs. Chen: Tanaka Sumie joint adaptation of the original (1941)
Fan: One-act (1944)
A woman's life: Five acts (1945)

References

External links 
 Historical Dictionary of Modern Japanese Literature and Theater, Google Books
 Japan's Modern Theatre: A Century of Change and Continuity, Google Books

1912 births
1946 deaths
Kyoto University alumni
20th-century Japanese dramatists and playwrights
20th-century deaths from tuberculosis
Tuberculosis deaths in Japan